Charles Thomas Gillingham (born January 26, 1960) is a keyboardist and multi-instrumentalist best known for his performance on the Hammond B-3 organ, accordion, piano, and keyboards for the band Counting Crows. He has also played the bass guitar in live shows during certain songs such as "Holiday in Spain".

Gillingham attended Richard Henry Dana Junior High in San Pedro, California, and also attended Miraleste High School in Rancho Palos Verdes his sophomore, junior and senior year. He was a member of Slip Stream, Clark, Kent, and the Reporters, Midnight Radio, Zip Code Revue, and played keyboards on Train's 1998 debut album.

In 2004, Gillingham was nominated for an Oscar as co-composer of the song "Accidentally in Love". He was put forward in the category Academy Award for Best Original Song with his fellow songwriters Adam Duritz, Jim Bogios, David Immerglück, Matt Malley, David Bryson and Dan Vickrey. The track was used in the film Shrek 2.

Gillingham studied philosophy and artificial intelligence at University of California, Berkeley. Before entering the music industry, he worked as a software engineer in the field of artificial intelligence.

Recordings
Apart from his work with Counting Crows, Gillingham also contributed to the following recordings:
Low Stars – Low Stars – 2007
Comfort in Sound – Feeder – 2003
Propeller – Peter Stuart – 2002
Nowhere is Brighter – Garrin Benfield – 2002
Still Waiting for Spring – Matt Nathanson – 2000
Train – Train – 1998
Whatnot – Cola – 1997
The Golden Age – Cracker – 1996
Abundance – Zip Code Revue – 1996
Slipaway – Jerry Shelfer – 1992
United Kingdom – American Music Club – 1990

See also
List of Hammond organ players

References

External links

1960 births
Living people
Counting Crows members
American rock pianists
American male pianists
American rock keyboardists
American rock bass guitarists
American male bass guitarists
American accordionists
American multi-instrumentalists
Songwriters from California
Musicians from Torrance, California
Guitarists from California
American male guitarists
20th-century American guitarists
20th-century American pianists
21st-century accordionists
21st-century American keyboardists
20th-century American keyboardists